The  is a 21.4 km railway line operated by Fukui Railway in Fukui Prefecture. Although it has its own right-of-way for most of the route, the Fukubu Line runs with traffic as a tram line past Fukui-Shin Station.

History

 26 July 1925: Heiei – Fukui-Shin (now ) section opens.
 5 June 1927: Sanjūhassha Station opens.
 5 October 1927: Mizuochi Station opens; former transfer station for the Seiho Electric Railway.
 13 August 1929: Kami-Sabae (now ), Shimo-Sabae (now ) stations open.
 15 October 1933: Fukui-Shin –  section opens.
 1 October 1935: Tobanaka Station opens; Nishi-Tobanaka Station (between Heiei and Tobanaka) closes.
 April 1939: Heiei Station is renamed Chūō Station.
 1 April 1941: Express service begins.
 1 August 1945: Fukubu Electric Railway merges with Seiho Electric Railway to form Fukui Railway.
 June 1946: Chūō Station renamed Shinmei Station.
 12 July 1950: Hanandō – Fukui-Shin section double-tracked.
 27 November 1950: Honmachi-dōri — Fukui-Shin section opens. Daimyōmachi Station is renamed Honmachi-dōri Station.
 1 April 1962: Keyamachi Station moved and renamed Kōenguchi Station. Fujishima-Jinja-mae Station (between Kidayotsutsuji and Kōenguchi) closes.
Saibanshomae Station moved towards Tawaramachi.
 1 September 1969: Service between Hanandō, Fukui-Ekimae, and Tawaramachi abolished; all trains run through to Takefu-Shin Station.
 2 October 1979: Freight services discontinued.
 10 April 1980: Centralized traffic control (CTC) introduced.
 1 August 1985: Driver-only operation introduced on morning and evening services.
 10 April 1987: Shimo-Sabae Station renamed Nishiyama-Kōen Station.
 1 October 1989: Hanandō-Minami Station opens.
 20 January 1993: All trains equipped with ATS.
 15 April 1993: Hanandō-Minami Station renamed Bell-mae Station.
 20 September 1997: Harmony Hall Station opens.
 30 November 1998: Daytime service interval changed to 20 minutes.
 15 July 2002: Honmachi-dōri Station (between Kōenguchi and Shiyakushomae) closed.
 1 December 2003: Part of Shiyakushomae — Fukui-Ekimae section single-tracked due to construction around Fukui Station.
 30 September 2004: Semi-express service abolished.
 January–March 2006: All station platforms modified to serve low-floor vehicles.
 1 April 2006: Low-floor trains enter service. Last departure time brought forward 30 minutes.
 16 December 2007: Daytime shuttle trains begin service between Fukui-Ekimae and Tawaramachi.

On March 25, 2010, Sports-Kōen Station was established between the Nishi-Takefu and Iehisa stations. At the same time, five stations were renamed: Takefu-Shin to Echizen-Takefu; Nishi-Takefu to Kitago; Kami-Sabae to Sundome-Nishi; Fukui-Shin to Sekijūjimae; and Saibanshomae to Jin'ai-Joshikōkō.

Station list 
All stations are located in Fukui Prefecture.
Express (急行) trains stop at stations marked "●", pass those marked "｜", and only a few stop at those marked "○". Most local trains stop at all stations but some pass those marked "○".
Staff:
 ◎ - Present all day
 ○ - Present except early mornings and late nights
 ◇ - Present during peak hours only
 △ - Present during holidays only
 × - Unstaffed
 ※ - Present during events only

 Note that distances for Jin'ai Joshikōkō and Tawaramachi Stations are measured from Shiyakushomae Station.

References

External links
Fukui Railway 

 
Railway lines opened in 1924
Railway lines in Japan
Rail transport in Fukui Prefecture
1067 mm gauge railways in Japan